William Kenny may refer to:

William Kenny (Irish politician) (1846–1921), Irish lawyer, judge and politician
William Kenny (VC) (1880–1936), recipient of the Victoria Cross
William David Kenny (1889–?), Irish recipient of the Victoria Cross
William Kenny (New Zealand politician) (1811–1880), member of the New Zealand Legislative Council  
William John Kenny (1853–1913), American Roman Catholic bishop
Ernie Kenny (William Ernest Kenny), ice hockey player
William Stopford Kenny (1788–1867), British writer on chess and educational subjects

See also
Billy Kenny (disambiguation)
Bill Kenny (disambiguation)